The women's 48 kg sambo event at the 2019 European Games in Minsk was held on 22 June at the Minsk Sports Palace.

Results
Legend

 VH – Total victory – painful hold
 VQ – Total victory – contestant's disqualification

Repechage

References

External links
Draw Sheet

Women's 48 kg